Peralta is a town in Valencia County, New Mexico, United States. Prior to its incorporation on July 1, 2007, it was a census-designated place (CDP). The population was 3,660 as of the 2010 census. Peralta is part of the Albuquerque metropolitan area.

Geography
Peralta is located at  (34.826464, -106.688916).

History
Peralta was the site of the Battle of Peralta, a minor engagement near the end of Confederate General Henry Hopkins Sibley's 1862 New Mexico Campaign during the Civil War.

"The Padre of Isleta", Anton Docher served as a priest in Peralta during his long period in Isleta.

Demographics

As of the census of 2000, there were 3,750 people, 1,314 households, and 1,034 families residing in the CDP. The population density was 851.4 people per square mile (329.1/km). There were 1,413 housing units at an average density of 320.8 per square mile (124.0/km). The racial makeup of the CDP was 66.88% White, 0.75% African American, 2.27% Native American, 0.32% Asian, 24.24% from other races, and 5.55% from two or more races. Hispanic or Latino of any race were 51.28% of the population.

There were 1,314 households, out of which 37.4% had children under the age of 18 living with them, 62.1% were married couples living together, 10.9% had a female householder with no husband present, and 21.3% were non-families. 16.3% of all households were made up of individuals, and 5.5% had someone living alone who was 65 years of age or older. The average household size was 2.85 and the average family size was 3.19.

In the CDP, the population was spread out, with 28.9% under the age of 18, 7.1% from 18 to 24, 28.9% from 25 to 44, 24.1% from 45 to 64, and 11.0% who were 65 years of age or older. The median age was 36 years. For every 100 females, there were 95.9 males. For every 100 females age 18 and over, there were 95.2 males.

The median income for a household in the CDP was $38,039, and the median income for a family was $39,605. Males had a median income of $31,916 versus $26,442 for females. The per capita income for the CDP was $15,511. About 10.6% of families and 11.5% of the population were below the poverty line, including 15.3% of those under age 18 and 13.6% of those age 65 or over.

Education
It is in the Los Lunas Public Schools school district.

The community's single public school, Peralta Elementary, is operated by Los Lunas Schools.

References

Towns in Valencia County, New Mexico
Towns in New Mexico
Former census-designated places in New Mexico
Albuquerque metropolitan area